"War Babies" is an episode of the British comedy television series The Goodies.

It was the last episode to be produced and transmitted by BBC Television.

This episode is also known as "World War 2".

Written by The Goodies, with songs and music by Bill Oddie.

Plot
It is the Second World War, and Tim, Bill and Graeme are only two years old.  However, they are much bigger in size than the usual two-year-old children — even bigger than the four-year-old, six-year-old, and eight-year-old children who are attending the same school for gifted children as they are.

Graeme and Bill are dressed in school uniforms and are both very intelligent two-year-old children.  Tim, however, arrives at the school in a pram wearing a bib and bonnet, so it would appear that his inclusion in a school for gifted children is a mistake — or too soon. There is some implication that Tim's rich parents have paid vast sums of money so that he can attend the school, despite his average intelligence.

When a live bomb crashes into the room that Tim, Bill and Graeme are in, they are given the task to disarm it.  Graeme and Bill set about disarming the bomb, but find the going difficult when Tim tries to put square objects into round holes and round objects into square holes, and tries banging the objects in, in his frustration to do so.  However, Bill and Graeme are successful in what they are doing and the bomb is disarmed.

Then they are given their next assignment — they are to enter Germany and bring a cigar back for Winston Churchill.  It is thought that, as children, they might find it easier to enter and leave Germany than an adult would.  Tim, Bill and Graeme parachute into Germany, and Graeme and Bill successfully land.  However, Bill misses catching Tim, who is all broken up as a result.  Graeme puts all of Tim's 'spare parts' into a pram, and then asks Bill for Tim's head (which is still in its bonnet) — however, Bill accidentally brings back a cabbage, much to Graeme's disgust.  After further searching, Tim's head is found and Graeme then 'operates' on him — giving Tim a clock for a heart, and a toy voicebox and a wind-up key to make Tim move, thereby turning Tim into the "Six Million Dollar Baby".

Back in England following their successful trip to Germany, the two-year-old Goodies are asked to impersonate Winston Churchill in public (as the "real" Churchill looks like Adolf Hitler). Tim is given the job of acting the part, but the Goodies run into unexpected problems.

Cultural references
 World War II
 Winston Churchill
 Adolf Hitler
 The Six Million Dollar Man
 Dad's Army

References

 "The Complete Goodies" — Robert Ross, B T Batsford, London, 2000
 "The Goodies Rule OK" — Robert Ross, Carlton Books Ltd, Sydney, 2006
 "From Fringe to Flying Circus — 'Celebrating a Unique Generation of Comedy 1960-1980'" — Roger Wilmut, Eyre Methuen Ltd, 1980
 "The Goodies Episode Summaries" — Brett Allender
 "The Goodies — Fact File" — Matthew K. Sharp
 "TV Heaven" — Jim Sangster & Paul Condon, HarperCollinsPublishers, London, 2005

External links
 

The Goodies (series 8) episodes
1980 British television episodes